The Investigation: A Search for Truth in Ten Acts (also known as The Investigation: A Crime in Ten Acts) was a live reading of excerpts from the Mueller Report, performed at New York City's Riverside Church on June 24, 2019. Actors and readers included John Lithgow as President Donald Trump, Kevin Kline as Robert Mueller, Joel Grey as Jeff Sessions, Jason Alexander as Chris Christie, and Alfre Woodard as Hope Hicks. Also participating were Annette Bening, Mark Hamill, Wilson Cruz, Justin Long, Julia Louis-Dreyfus, Alyssa Milano, Ben McKenzie, Piper Perabo, Zachary Quinto, Michael Shannon, and Sigourney Weaver. The Investigation was written by Robert Schenkkan.

Cast
 Annette Bening as Narrator
 John Lithgow as President Donald Trump
 Kevin Kline as Robert S. Mueller III
 Jason Alexander as Chris Christie
 Wilson Cruz as Rob Porter
 Noah Emmerich as Steve Bannon/Felix Sater
 Gina Gershon as K. T. McFarland/Rick Gates
 Joel Grey as Jeff Sessions
 Mark Hamill as Himself
 Justin Long as James Comey
 Julia Louis-Dreyfus as Herself
 John Malkovich as Himself
 Ben McKenzie as Michael Flynn/Donald Trump Jr.
 Alyssa Milano as Annie Donaldson/Jay Sekulow
 Bill Moyers as Himself (Introduction)
 Piper Perabo as Rob Goldstone/Jared Kushner
 Aidan Quinn as Michael Cohen
 Zachary Quinto as Rod Rosenstein/Rudy Giuliani/William Barr
 Kyra Sedgwick as Sarah Sanders
 Michael Shannon as Don McGahn
 Sigourney Weaver as Herself
 Frederick Weller as Reince Priebus/Paul Manafort
 Alfre Woodard as Hope Hicks

References

External links
 Schenkkan, Robert (June 27, 2019). "The Investigation: A Search for the Truth in Ten Acts". Law Works. YouTube. 

2019 in American politics
2019 in New York City
2019 works
Presidency of Donald Trump